Secret Mother is a 2018 South Korean television series starring Song Yoon-ah and Kim So-yeon with Kim Tae-woo and Song Jae-rim. The series aired four consecutive episodes on Saturday on SBS TV from 8:55 to 11:15 p.m. (KST) starting from May 12, 2018.

Synopsis
Story of a mysterious surrogate mother who enters the home of a woman holding the secret behind her child's death.

Cast

Main
Song Yoon-ah as Kim Yoon-jin
An ex-psychiatrist who forgoes her job to become a full-time housewife after the death of her daughter. She was not only a successful doctor, but she became the head of the board of directors to her father's medical foundation. She is extremely dedicated to her son's education, and hires Kim Lisa to ensure her son's admission to a prestigious university. 
Kim So-yeon as Kim Eun-young (Lisa Kim)
A mysterious "surrogate mother" who oversees students' academic endeavors, and help them to achieve the path of an elite. In reality, she takes on the alias of "Kim Lisa" to find someone who was like a sister to her when they grew up in an orphanage.
Kim Tae-woo as Han Jae-yeol
Kim Yoon-jin's husband. An elite police chief who graduated from the police academy with honors.
Song Jae-rim as Ha Jung-wan 
A homicide detective who is blunt and rash. He is the only person who believes in Kim Yoon-jin's doubts about her daughter's death and helps her find the truth behind it.

Supporting
Cha Hwa-yeon as Park Sun-ja 
Yoon-jin's mother-in-law. Director of a hospital. 
Seo Young-hee as Kang Hye-kyung.
A "Gangnam Mom" who is in constant pursuit of culture and perfection. 
Kim Jae-hwa as Myung Hwa-sook
A "Devil Mom" who only made it to Gangnam after hitting the jackpot with stocks, and whose goal is putting her child in an international school. 
Oh Yeon-ah as Song Ji-ae 
 A "Desire Mom" who outshines her own child, and wants to raise them to become the best in the world.
Min Sung-wook as Jung Suk-hwan
A senior executive at a large company. Hye-kyung's husband. 
Ahn Sang-woo as Yoon Seung-soo 
An officer at Ministry of Land Transportation, who quit his job to become a private investigator. Hwa-sook's ex-husband. 
 Kim Byeong-ok as Lee Byung-hak
A renter who owns several buildings. Ji-ae's husband.

Extended
Yum Ji-yoon as Han Joo-hee  
Kim Ye-jun as Han Min-joon, Yoon-jin's son
Choi Yoo-ri as Jung Soo-min, Hye-kyung and Suk-hwan's daughter 
Song Ji-woo as Yoon Ji-ho, Hwa-sook and Seung-soo's son 
Lee Go-eun as Lee Chae-rin, Ji-ae and Byung-hak's daughter
Son Seung-woo as Shin Se-yeon
Kwon Do-kyun as Min Tae-hwan
Kang Sang-won as Lee Chi-yeol

Original soundtrack

Part 1

Part 2

Part 3

Part 4

Part 5

Part 6

Ratings
 In the table below,  represent the lowest ratings and  represent the highest ratings.
NR denotes that the drama did not rank in the top 20 daily programs on that date.
TNmS stop publishing their report from June 2018.

Episodes 21-24 did not air on June 16 due to coverage of the 2018 FIFA World Cup Group D match between Argentina and Iceland.

Awards and nominations

Notes

References

External links 
 
 

Seoul Broadcasting System television dramas
2018 South Korean television series debuts
Korean-language television shows
South Korean mystery television series
South Korean thriller television series
Pregnancy-themed television shows
2018 South Korean television series endings
Examinations and testing in fiction
Television series by Studio S